Asenvågøy Lighthouse or Asenvågsøya Lighthouse is a coastal lighthouse in the municipality of Ørland in Trøndelag county, Norway. It was built in 1921, and it was automated in 1975.

The  square tower is made out of wood, and it is attached to a -story lighthouse keeper's house. The light flashes in white, red, and green (depending on direction) and it is occulting once every six seconds. The site is only accessible by boat. The site is open, but the tower is closed to the public.

See also

Lighthouses in Norway
List of lighthouses in Norway

References

External links
 Norsk Fyrhistorisk Forening 

Lighthouses completed in 1921
Ørland
Lighthouses in Trøndelag